Zhao Junpeng (born 2 February 1996) is a Chinese badminton player. In 2016 and 2017, he became the runner-up at the China International Challenge tournament in the men's singles event. He won his first senior international title at the 2016 Macau Open Grand Prix Gold where he defeated Chou Tien-chen of Chinese Taipei in straight games in the final.

Achievements

BWF World Championships 
Men's singles

BWF World Junior Championships 
Boys' singles

Asian Junior Championships 
Boys' singles

BWF World Tour (1 runner-up)
The BWF World Tour, which was announced on 19 March 2017 and implemented in 2018, is a series of elite badminton tournaments sanctioned by the Badminton World Federation (BWF). The BWF World Tours are divided into levels of World Tour Finals, Super 1000, Super 750, Super 500, Super 300 (part of the HSBC World Tour), and the BWF Tour Super 100.

Men's singles

BWF Grand Prix (1 title) 
The BWF Grand Prix had two levels, the BWF Grand Prix and Grand Prix Gold. It was a series of badminton tournaments sanctioned by the Badminton World Federation (BWF) held from 2007 to 2017.

Men's singles

  BWF Grand Prix Gold tournament
  BWF Grand Prix tournament

BWF International Challenge/Series (2 runners-up) 
Men's singles

  BWF International Challenge tournament
  BWF International Series tournament

Record against selected opponents 
Record against year-end Finals finalists, World Championships semi-finalists, and Olympic quarter-finalists. Accurate as of 5 November 2022.

References

External links 
 

1996 births
Living people
People from Nanchang
Badminton players from Jiangxi
Chinese male badminton players